The 2011–12 Saint Louis Billikens men's basketball team represented Saint Louis University in the 2011–12 NCAA Division I men's basketball season. The Billikens were led by sixth year head coach Rick Majerus and played their home games at Chaifetz Arena. They are a member of the Atlantic 10 Conference. They finished the season 26–8, 12–4 in A-10 play to finish in second place. They were champions of the 2011 76 Classic. They lost in the semifinals of the Atlantic 10 Basketball tournament to Xavier. They received an at-large bid to the 2012 NCAA tournament where they defeated Memphis in the second round before falling in the third round to Michigan State.

Roster

Season schedule

|-
!colspan=12 style=| Exhibition

|-
!colspan=12 style=|Non-conference regular season

|-
|-
!colspan=12 style=| Atlantic 10 regular season

|-
!colspan=12 style=| A-10 tournament

|-
!colspan=12 style=| NCAA tournament

References

Saint Louis
Saint Louis Billikens men's basketball seasons
Saint Louis
Saint Louis Bilikens men's basketball
Saint Louis Bilikens men's basketball